"Rock It" is the second single from English drum and bass producer Sub Focus's self-titled debut album, released on 26 July 2009. It was Sub Focus' most successful solo single from the album, peaking at number 38 on the UK Singles Chart.

The B-side, "Follow the Light", was also included on Sub Focus's debut album. The song contains vocals from the drum and bass act TC, but the album version uses newer lyrics than the vocal single version. There are also additional vocals from Takura in the single version, but they are based on the same lyrics as the song "Coming Closer", the final track of Sub Focus's album (which actually features Takura).

Both songs on the EP were featured in the 2010 video game Gran Turismo 5.

Track listing

Chart performance

References

2009 singles
Sub Focus songs
RAM Records singles
Songs written by Sub Focus